Peter Thrower (born 1938) is a professor emeritus of materials science and engineering at  Pennsylvania State University, and a former editor-in-chief of the scientific journal Carbon, a post he has held between 1982 and 2013. A special issue of Carbon was published in his honor in August 2012. He also edited the review journal Chemistry and Physics of Carbon from 1973 to 1998. He is a specialist on carbon in all its forms.

Thrower studied physics at the University of Cambridge. He then took up a position at the Atomic Energy Research Establishment (Harwell, UK) before moving to Pennsylvania State University, where he remained until he retired in 1998.

References

1938 births
British physicists
Carbon scientists
Living people
Pennsylvania State University faculty
Alumni of the University of Cambridge